Mean Machine is the second studio album by German heavy metal band U.D.O. It was released in 1989 via RCA Records. After their previous album, Animal House, Peter Szigeti had been replaced by Andy Susemihl from Sinner, Frank Rittel by Thomas Smuszynski (who later went on to Running Wild) and Thomas Franke by Stefan Schwarzmann. Dieter Rubach, who joined the band after the recording of Animal House left and was replaced by Smuszynski.

Track listing

Personnel 
 Udo Dirkschneider – vocals
 Mathias Dieth – guitars
 Andy Susemihl – guitars
 Thomas Smuszynski – bass
 Stefan Schwarzmann – drums

Production
 Mark Dodson – producer, mixing
 Uli Baronowsky – engineer
 Tim Eckhorst – design (anniversary edition)
 Deaffy, Didi Zill – cover concept

References

External links 
 Official U.D.O. website
 RCA record label website

1989 albums
U.D.O. albums
Albums produced by Mark Dodson
RCA Records albums